Fuqing railway station is a railway station located in Fuqing City, Fujian Province, China, on the Fuzhou–Xiamen railway operated by the Nanchang Railway Bureau, China Railway Corporation.

References 

Railway stations in Fujian
Fuqing